Justice Pope may refer to:

Jack Pope (1913–2017), associate justice and chief justice of the Supreme Court of Texas
Young J. Pope (1844–1911), associate justice and chief justice of the South Carolina Supreme Court

See also
Judge Pope (disambiguation)